Carex castanea, known as chestnut sedge, is a species of flowering plant in the sedge family (Cyperaceae) native to North America. It is listed as endangered in Connecticut, Massachusetts, and New Hampshire. It occurs from Manitoba to the eastern seaboard in Canada and from Minnesota to New England in the United States. It is sometimes called chestnut woodland sedge or chestnut-colored  sedge.

References

castanea
Flora of North America